Brian Lara International Cricket 2005, known as Ricky Ponting Cricket in Australia and New Zealand, is a cricket video game from Codemasters, available on Xbox, PlayStation 2 and Windows platforms, released on 21 July 2005, which was the first day of the 2005 Ashes series. The game is followed by Brian Lara International Cricket 2007 (Ricky Ponting International Cricket 2007 in Australia and New Zealand and Yuvraj Singh International Cricket in India).

Details
This game is the follow-up to Brian Lara Cricket '99 (also known as Shane Warne Cricket '99 in Australia and New Zealand). It contains the 2003 Cricket World Cup in Africa and the 2004 ICC Champions Trophy. These two competitions are licensed by the International Cricket Council (ICC) and contain official player names, faces, kits, badges and sponsors. All other modes are unofficial as the rights for these belong to EA Sports and therefore some players and kits are made up; for example Graham Thorpe becomes "G Thrip" and Shane Warne becomes "S Worde". The only correct names in these modes are Brian Lara himself, (shown as "B Lara"), and Australian Captain Ricky Ponting (similarly shown as R Ponting). The game is also first to include licensed bats such as the Kookaburra Diablo and the GM Purist. The game takes the perspective of the normal cricket TV coverage, other views and displays in the game also try to emulate TV coverage of cricket, for example Hawk-Eye, an electronic system used to track cricket balls as they are bowled is featured in the game.

Game modes
There are a few types of cricket that can be played in the game. Test match, Test series, One Day match, World Cup, ICC Champion's Trophy and practice mode. Along with the types of cricket there are several difficulty settings. Slog mode, village, county and test. With each difficulty bowling and batting decreases in ease. The game also offers the player to construct their own team from cricketers already in the game, and to construct their own "Career Players" who gain experience with each match. There is also a "Classic XI" mode, which has famous cricketers of the past such as W.G. Grace, Imran Khan and Jim Laker.

Challenges
There are also a challenge mode in the game, where the player can take on cricketing challenges based on notable cricket matches from the past. The player can either recreate or rewrite history, depending on the team they choose to play as. These include such matches as The birth of The Ashes, the 1933 Bodyline test match, Garfield Sobers' six sixes, and the 2003 ICC Cricket World Cup final. There are 10 challenges in total.

Reaction and criticism
Reaction from critics was very good with ratings averaging around 7.5 out of 10.

Notes

External links 
Official Codemasters website

2005 video games
Brian Lara video games
Cricket video games
Codemasters games
PlayStation 2 games
Xbox games
Windows games
Video games set in India
Video games set in New Zealand
Video games developed in the United Kingdom
Multiplayer and single-player video games